Lake Wakatipu is an inland lake (finger lake) in the South Island of New Zealand.  It is in the southwest corner of the Otago region, near its boundary with Southland. Lake Wakatipu comes from the original Māori name .

The general topography is a reversed "N" shape or "dog leg". The Dart River / Te Awa Whakatipu flows into the northern end, the lake then runs south for 30 kilometres before turning abruptly to the east. Twenty kilometres (12.4 mi) further along, it turns sharply to the south, reaching its southern end  further south, near Kingston.

Until about 18,000 years ago the Mataura River drained Lake Wakatipu. The Kingston Flyer follows part of the former river bed now blocked by glacial moraine. Queenstown is on the northern shore of the lake close to eastern end of its middle section.

Lake Wakatipu is renowned for its scenic beauty, as it is surrounded by mountains.  Two mountain ranges, the Remarkables and the Tapuae-o-Uenuku / Hector Mountains, lie along its southeastern edge. It is a popular venue for adventure tourism, with skifields, paragliding, bungy jumping and tramping tracks within easy reach.  A vintage steamboat, the TSS Earnslaw regularly plies its waters. Several vineyards are nearby in Gibbston.

Etymology
The full original name of the lake is Whakatipu-wai-Māori.  While the lake lacks an official name, it is generally referred to as "Lake Wakatipu".

The name is believed to originate from the Waitaha people, who were later displaced by Kāti Māmoe. Elders from the modern iwi Ngāi Tahu say that while the name Whakatipu is archaic and its original meaning is a mystery, whaka means causative and tipu means growth. Wakatipu could mean "growing bay" if the original was Whakatipu and the h elided as a result of the Southern Māori dialect. The dialect is also known for dropping final vowels. Waka can also mean 'hollow'. Wakatipua or Whakatipua (Canoe/Bay of spirits) have been recorded historically, as has Wakatapu (sacred vessel).

Whakatipu is also the name of another six unrelated geographical features in the South Island, including Tarahaka Whakatipu, the Harris Saddle at the head of the Routeburn Track; Te Awa Whakatipu, the main Dart River / Te Awa Whakatipu flowing into the lake; Whakatipu Katuka, the Hollyford River and Valley; and Whakatipu Kohurangi, Māori Bay in Pelorus Sound / Te Hoiere, Marlborough.

A legend says that the lake bed was formed when a giant ogre, Kopu-wai, was burned while lying asleep, leaving only his heart behind, which according to the same legend is the cause of the rhythmic rise and fall of the lake's seiche.

Flooding 
Lake Wakatipu has experienced periodic flooding  affecting the lakeside communities of Kingston, Glenorchy and Queenstown. Notable flooding events include the 1878 Queenstown floods, which affected a large part of the outlying Queenstown and Otago areas, the 1995 Queenstown floods, and most notably the 1999 Queenstown floods, which significantly damaged the Queenstown CBD and road infrastructure resulting in approximately $50 million worth of damage.

Wildlife
Lake Wakatipu is a habitat for the longfin eel (a specimen caught in 1886 is the largest known of this species), brown trout, salmon and rainbow trout. These and other fish support predators such as the pied shag. The black-billed gull is often found around the lake while the most common birds are the black-billed gull and the introduced mallard. A smaller bird often not noticed because of its size is the New Zealand scaup.

In popular culture

Film
Lake Wakatipu doubled as the Scottish Loch Ness in the 2007 film The Water Horse: Legend of the Deep.

The lake was a backdrop for several scenes in The Lord of the Rings: The Fellowship of the Ring, including Amon Hen.

Television
Lake Wakatipu is the eponymous lake in the murder mystery television series Top of the Lake (2013).

Sports

Swimming
The first person to swim the length of the lake was Ben Campbell-Macdonald. The 81 km  solo wetsuit swim from Kingston on the lake's southern point to Glenorchy took 18.5 hours.

See also 
 List of lakes in New Zealand

References

External links

  at the Department of Conservation

Lakes of Otago
Queenstown-Lakes District